Bartłomiej Wawak (born 25 August 1993) is a Polish cross-country mountain biker, who currently rides for the Kross Orlen Racing Team. He is expected to compete in the cross-country race at the 2020 Summer Olympics.

Major results
2013
 1st  Marathon, UEC European Under-23 Championships
2014
 2nd Cross-country, National Championships
2015
 2nd Cross-country, National Championships
2016
 1st  Cross-country, National Championships
2018
 1st  Cross-country, National Championships
2019
 1st  Cross-country, National Championships
2020
 2nd Cross-country, National Championships
2021
 1st  Cross-country short course, National Championships
2022
 National Championships
1st  Cross-country
2nd Cross-country short course

References

External links

1993 births
Living people
Polish male cyclists
Olympic cyclists of Poland
Cyclists at the 2020 Summer Olympics
Sportspeople from Bielsko-Biała
Cross-country mountain bikers